The knockout stage of the 2013 Campeonato Paulista began on 27 April with the quarter-finals and concluded on 19 May 2013 with the final at Vila Belmiro in Santos.

Round and draw dates
All draws held at Federação Paulista de Futebol headquarters in São Paulo, Brazil.

Format
The quarter-finals are played in one match at stadium of the best teams in the first phase. The 1st placed confronts the 8th, 2nd against the 7th, the 3rd against 6th and 4th against 5th. If no goals are scored during the match, the tie is decided by penalty shootout. The semi-finals are played in the same way of the quarter-finals.
The final matches are played over two legs, with the best campaign team in previous stages playing the second match at home.

Qualified teams

Bracket

Quarter-finals

Semi-finals

Finals

References

Campeonato Paulista seasons